HMS Trojan was an  destroyer, which served with the Royal Navy. The vessel was the only one named in honour of the citizens of Troy that has been operated by the navy. Launched on 12 July 1918, Trojan was too late to see service in the First World War. Initially allocated to the Grand Fleet and then, when this was dissolved, the Atlantic Fleet, the destroyer was transferred to the Reserve Fleet, like many of the class, within two years of being first commissioned. The vessel remained in reserve until 24 September 1936, although in a deteriorating condition. On that day, Trojan was sold to be broken up as part of a deal for the liner Majestic.

Design and development

Trojan was one of thirty-three Admiralty  destroyers ordered by the British Admiralty in June 1917 as part of the Twelfth War Construction Programme. Differences with the R class were minor, such as having the searchlight moved aft and mounting an additional pair of torpedo tubes.

Two funnels were fitted.

Armament consisted of three QF  Mk IV guns on the ship's centreline.  One was mounted raised on the forecastle, one between the funnels and one aft. The ship also mounted a single  2-pounder pom-pom anti-aircraft gun for air defence. Four  torpedo tubes were fitted in two twin rotating mounts aft. The ship was also equipped with two  torpedo tubes either side of the superstructure which were fired by the commanding officer using toggle ropes. Fire control included a training-only director, single Dumaresq and a Vickers range clock. The ship had a complement of 90 officers and ratings.

Construction and career
Trojan was laid down by J. Samuel White at East Cowes on the Isle of Wight with the yard number 1512 on 3 January 1918, and launched on 12 July the same year. The ship was completed on 6 December. The vessel is the only one to have carried the name, which recalled the inhabitants of Troy, to have served in the Royal Navy. The destroyer was to join the Fourteenth Destroyer Flotilla of the Grand Fleet but the signing of the Armistice which ended the First World War meant the vessel saw no active service.

With the dissolution of the Grand Fleet, Trojan was allocated to the Third Destroyer Flotilla of the Atlantic Fleet. The ship did not remain long in service, however, and was commissioned into the Reserve Fleet at Portsmouth on 16 August 1920. Trojan remained in reserve until 14 September 1936 when the ship was given to Thos. W. Ward of Sheffield in exchange for the liner Majestic. Having remained on reserve for more than a decade, Trojan was found to be in poor condition. The destroyer was subsequently broken up at Inverkeithing.

Pennant numbers

References

Citations

Bibliography

 
 
 
 
 
 
 
 
 

1918 ships
S-class destroyers (1917) of the Royal Navy
Ships built on the Isle of Wight
World War I destroyers of the United Kingdom